Dan Gill (born July 8, 1982) is a retired American gymnast and current Chief Product officer of Carvana. Formerly, Dan was the CEO of webforum company Huddler.  Gill was an all-arounder, but weaker in rings and parallel bars than the other events.  He attributed this to his relatively tall stature for a gymnast (5-8 or 5-9).  On floor exercise, Gill performed an extremely difficult mount:  a double-twisting double backflip with immediate punch to a one and one-quarter front flip.  On high bar, he dismounted with a rare difficult trick, a triple twisting double layout (Fedorchenko).

Boys' gymnastics

Gill competed for James Robinson High School and won many awards.  In 2000, he became the first Virginia athlete to score a 10.0 (on the high bar).  That year, he also set the nationwide record for all around at high school national championships.  Gill was a club gymnast at Burke's Capital Gymnastics under coach Carlos Vasquez.  Gill was a two time member of the US Junior National Team.

College career

Gill competed for Stanford from 2001 to 2004, where he was a many-time all-American.  In 2001 and 2002, he overlapped with David Durante.  In 2001, the Cardinal won NCAAs.  At the 2002 NCAA championships, Gill won gold on the vault.  In 2004, Gill was the team's captain and won silver in the all-around at championships.  That year, Gill won the Nissen-Emery Award, the Heisman of men's gymnastics.

Elite career

Gill became a member of the U.S. National Team in 2003 and was a part of the bronze medal-winning team at Pan American Games that year.  At the 2003 National Championships, he finished 11th all around, sixth on floor exercise, and fifth on vault.

At the 2004 Nationals, Gill won silver on the floor exercise and performed well enough overall to be invited to Olympic Trials.  At Trials, Gill moved from 12th to 7th at one point (threatening for a spot on the team), but a fall on the high bar dashed his chances.  He described Trials as the high point of his athletic career and a more tense meet than the Olympics (because of the dividing line between Olympians and non-Olympians).

Post-athletic career

Gill completed a bachelor's degree in biology and was planning for a career as a physician (perhaps an orthopedic surgeon).  However, gymnastics competition had interfered with taking MCATs and Gill eventually decided to go into Silicon Valley startups instead of medicine.

After experience elsewhere, Gill, along with his brother, founded Huddler.  The company makes software for online forums and has raised $17 million venture funding.  Gill believes his experience as a gymnast has given him the persistence needed for sales and marketing and that being a team captain translates to leading a startup.

References

External links
NCAA floor exercise: The double-twisting double backflip to punch front one and one quarter flip is at the beginning of the routine.
Huddler (Gill's dotcom startup)

Stanford Cardinal men's gymnasts
American male artistic gymnasts
1982 births
Living people